A swindle is a kind of fraud or confidence trick. 

Swindle may also refer to:

People
 Swindle (surname)

Places
 Swindle Island, British Columbia, Canada
 8690 Swindle, an asteroid

Films
 Il bidone (English titles The Swindle or The Swindlers), a 1955 Italian film directed by Federico Fellini
 The Swindle (1997 film), a French crime-comedy film directed by Claude Chabrol and starring Isabelle Huppert
 Swindle (2002 film),  a crime thriller starring Tom Sizemore and Sherilyn Fenn
 Swindle (2013 film), a  television film based on Gordon Korman's book Swindle

Other uses
 Swindle (chess), a ruse by which a chess player in a losing position tricks his opponent
 Swindle (Transformers), several fictional characters in the Transformers universe
 Swindle (novel), a 2008 children's book by Gordon Korman
 Swindle (magazine), a bi-monthly arts and culture publication from 2004 to 2009
 The Swindle (video game), a 2015 video game

See also
 Swindler (disambiguation)
 Swindled (film), a 2004 Spanish-French thriller